This is a list of the largest stations in Australia, which includes stations with an area in excess of .

All of the largest pastoral leases are located in the states of South Australia (SA), Queensland (QLD) and Western Australia (WA); or in the Northern Territory (NT).

The vast majority are cattle stations, with no sheep stations among the ten largest. Most of the properties are owned by pastoral companies such as Australian Agricultural Company, Consolidated Pastoral Company, S. Kidman & Co Ltd, North Australian Pastoral Company, Heytesbury Pty. Ltd., Paraway Pastoral Company and the Jumbuck Pastoral Company.

Largest stations 

This list includes the stations in Australia by virtue of area:

See also
List of ranches and stations#Australia
Pastoral lease

References

Australia-related lists of superlatives
-
-
-
-
Northern Territory-related lists
Queensland-related lists
South Australia-related lists
Western Australia-related lists
Agriculture-related lists